Josef Matouš (born 6 January 1942) is a Czechoslovakian former ski jumper who competed from 1963 to 1974. He finished fourth in the individual normal hill event at the 1964 Winter Olympics in Innsbruck. Matouš's best career finish was third twice, both earned in the individual normal hill event in Oberstdorf, West Germany in 1968 and 1969. He was born in Poděbrady.

Notes

External links

1942 births
Living people
People from Poděbrady
Ski jumpers at the 1964 Winter Olympics
Czech male ski jumpers
Czechoslovak male ski jumpers
Olympic ski jumpers of Czechoslovakia
Sportspeople from the Central Bohemian Region